The Vancouver Showcase was a men's and women's college basketball tournament that was first played in November 18 through 20, 2018 at the Vancouver Convention Centre in Vancouver, British Columbia, Canada. during the 2018-19 NCAA Division I men's basketball season and 2018-19 NCAA Division I women's basketball season.  Four men's and eight women's teams participated in the tournament.  The event moved to Victoria, B.C. for 2019 after the loss of local support in Vancouver.

Brackets 
* – Denotes overtime period

2018

Men's

Women's

References

College basketball competitions
2016 establishments in British Columbia
2017 disestablishments in British Columbia
Basketball in Canada
Basketball in British Columbia
Sports competitions in Canada
Sports competitions in British Columbia
Recurring sporting events established in 2016
Recurring sporting events disestablished in 2017